Sardar Vallabhbhai Patel International Airport  is an international airport serving the twin cities of Ahmedabad and Gandhinagar in Gujarat, India. It is named after Sardar Vallabhbhai Patel, the 1st Deputy Prime Minister of India. The airport is the busiest and largest airport in the state of Gujarat.The airport is the 7th busiest airport in India .

In fiscal year 2021–22, it handled about 5.67 million passengers making it the seventh-busiest airport in terms of passenger traffic in India. The airport serves as a focus city for GoAir. In 2015, the government started the procedure for the privatization of the airport. The new Dholera International Airport is being developed due to expansion constraints at the current airport.

History

The airport was set up in 1937, while international operations began on 26 January 1991. It was categorised as an International airport on 23 May 2000.

In March 2004, Ahmedabad gained a nonstop link to the United Kingdom, which is home to a large Gujarati community. Air India commenced a Boeing 747 service to London's Heathrow Airport, with Jet Airways joining a few years later. However, both carriers decided to withdraw their flights in 2008. Air India then began a route to Frankfurt, which lasted until the airline closed its hub in the German city in 2010.

In 2010, the new Terminal 2 was inaugurated for handling international passengers. A  statue of Sardar Vallabhbhai Patel was also inaugurated at the airport. In 2015, the AAI invited proposals for privatization of Ahmedabad, Chennai, Kolkata and Jaipur airports. Air India reinstated direct services to London the following year.

A 700 kWp rooftop solar plant was commissioned at the airport on 21 March 2017.

Structure
The airport currently consists of four terminals: domestic, international, an additional terminal for secondary traffic and a cargo terminal as well. The airport has 45 parking bays and both the international and domestic terminals have four aero-bridges each. The new terminal has been modelled based on Singapore Changi Airport.

The new terminal has a half-kilometre-long moving walkway, which connects the two terminals. Airports Authority of India (AAI) will construct a new technical block which will enhance the flight handling capacity and provide better control of flights.

Runway

Air traffic control tower
As part of the airport modernisation process, the AAI announced that it would construct a new air traffic control (ATC) building that would include a new airport tower  in height.

Terminals

Terminal 1

In December 2018, a new Plaza Premium lounge was opened at Terminal 1 (near Gate 4 on first floor), which caters for Priority Pass and other select bank cards as well as some business class passengers based on airline flown.

Terminal 2

Terminal 2 was inaugurated on 5 July 2010 and opened for international flights on 15 September 2010. The terminal won the award for the best Steel Structure at the 2009 edition of the National Structural Steel Design and Construction Awards. The terminal has four aerobridges and 32 check-in counters. With the total floor area of approximately 41,000 sq. meters, this terminal will be able to accommodate around 1,600 passengers at any given time. In November 2018, a new Plaza Premium lounge was opened at the international departures area of Terminal 2, which caters for business class and first class passengers as well as passengers holding Priority Pass and other bank cards. The new  apron area can cater for the parking of nine A-321 and four ATR-72 type of aircraft.

Cargo Terminal
The airport handled 51,637 tonnes of cargo, inclusive of gold and silver in 2013–14. Sixty percent of the cargo comes from domestic sources. In 2009,  of land was leased for a period of seven years out by the AAI to Gujarat Agro Industries Corporation to set up a center for perishable cargo. However, due to a government policy that prevented third-party operations at airports run by the AAI, the CPC was not in use until July 2014, when the minister of state for civil aviation announced that the government had issued a No Objection Certificate for commencement of operations. In 2014, it was announced that the airport would be getting a dedicated cargo terminal which is expected to come up at Terminal 3.

Airlines and destinations

Passenger

Cargo

Statistics

Future
Due to growing demands and rise in passenger traffic, the airport will get a third passenger terminal just beside Terminal 1, by shifting the present cargo terminal to beside Terminal 2, which will increase the airport's capacity. After that, the airport could not be further expanded due to limited space for the future. Being developed in three phases, the first phase of the airport will be completed by December 2025.

Awards
The airport was awarded as the Most Improved Airport in the Asia-Pacific Region by the Airports Council International in 2017. In 2019, it received three awards for the Best Airport for Customer Service, Best Airport for Environment and Ambience and Best Airport for Infrastructure and Facilitation from the Airport Service Quality (ASQ) Survey for 2019 conducted by Airports Council International.

Accidents and incidents
Indian Airlines Flight 113 operating from Mumbai to Ahmedabad crashed on its final approach to the airport on 19 October 1988, killing 130 people including all 6 crew members. The flight was cleared for a visual approach into a foggy airport, when it struck trees and a high-tension pylon at a distance of 5 km from Runway 23, before crashing into a field and bursting into flames.
Jet Airways Flight 2510, coming in from Indore collapsed on the runway while landing at the airport on 22 July 2010. There were 57 passengers and four crew members on board the ATR flight. Some passengers received minor injuries as the nose wheel reportedly collapsed due to a tyre burst.
In January 2018, a stray cow on the runway had caused chaos at airport leading to two planes aborting their landings. The cow crept past security at a cargo gate at the airport resulting in a cargo plane being diverted to Mumbai and delaying five domestic flights and several departures. It took over 90 minutes for the security personnel to clear the runway from the cow.

See also
 Dholera International Airport
 Airports in India
 List of busiest airports in India by passenger traffic

References

External links

 Sardar Vallabhbhai Patel International Airport, Ahmedabad, official website

Airports in Gujarat
International airports in India
Transport in Ahmedabad
1937 establishments in India
Airports established in 1937
20th-century architecture in India